is a Japanese singer, lyricist and illustrator, signed to Sacra Music under Sony Music Labels. Starting her singing career by covering J-pop music and anime songs, she made her debut as a solo artist on April 13, 2022, with the release of her debut EP Dignified. Two tracks from the EP, "dust" and "melt", were used as the opening and ending theme song in the anime film series The Legend of the Galactic Heroes: Die Neue These Gekitotsu. SennaRin's first single, "Saihate", was featured as the ending theme song in the anime Bleach: Thousand-Year Blood War.

Career
SennaRin was born in Fukuoka Prefecture, in 2001. In 2019, she started a YouTube channel and began uploading her covers of popular Japanese songs, mostly the ones featured in anime.

In early 2022, SennaRin made three pre-releases of tracks from the extended play Dignified—all of which were used in collaboration projects. The first track, "dust", was released on March 3, 2022; it was used as the opening theme song in the anime film series The Legend of the Galactic Heroes: Die Neue These Gekitotsu. The second track, "BEEP", released on March 7, 2022, was used as the theme song on J Sports Rugby 2022. The third track, "melt", released on March 13, 2022, was used as the ending theme song in the anime film series The Legend of the Galactic Heroes: Die Neue These Gekitotsu.

On March 13, 2022, SennaRin attended the live event "Hiroyuki Sawano LIVE [nZk]007", at Tokyo International Forum. The event had performances by her and other guest vocals, being later streamed to overseas audiences.

SennaRin's performances on YouTube, which have already received over 9 million views, caught the attention of the Japanese composer and music producer Hiroyuki Sawano, leading him to produce her debut extended play Dignified. The EP, released on April 13, 2022, charted at number 59 at Oricon.

Her first live concert, "HIGH FIVE 2022", was held on April 15, 2022, in her hometown of Fukuoka.

On June 18, 2022, in Saudi Arabia, SennaRin held her first solo concert of her career. The event took place at Anime Village, in Jeddah, with her performing 16 songs.

SennaRin performed at Animethon 2022, an anime convention that took place in August 2022, in Edmonton, Canada. She also attended a live concert at Shibuya WWWX on October 7.

SennaRin released her first single, "Saihate", on November 23, 2022. The song was used as the ending theme song in the anime Bleach: Thousand-Year Blood War, that aired in October 2022.

Musical style and influences
SennaRin is defined as a "next generation pop singer", described as having an appealing, husky and soft voice. She is also referred as a singer with a "characteristic low tone and a sense of transparency".

Discography

Extended plays

Singles

Songs appearances

Videography

Music videos

References

External links 
  
 Discography at VGMdb
 SennaRin profile at Oricon 
 

2001 births
21st-century Japanese women singers
Anime singers

Living people
Musicians from Fukuoka Prefecture
Sacra Music artists